Paphiopedilum subgenus Paphiopedilum is a subgenus of the genus Paphiopedilum.

Distribution
Plants from this section are found from Bhutan, Bangladesh, south to Myanmar, Thailand, Laos and Vietnam to west China.

Species
Paphiopedilum subgenus Paphiopedilum comprises the following species:

References

Orchid subgenera